The Sahara Desert ant (Cataglyphis bicolor) is a desert-dwelling ant of the genus Cataglyphis. It primarily inhabits the Sahara Desert and is one of the most heat tolerant animals known to date. However, there are at least four other species of Cataglyphis living in the Sahara desert, for example C. bombycina,  and C. fortis. Also, specimens of C. bicolor have been found well north of Sahara.

Background
Sahara Desert ants are scavengers. They forage for the corpses of insects and other arthropods which have succumbed to the heat stress of their desert environment.

Despite this, if out in the open, they must keep moving or else they will fry.

The ants navigate the desert terrain by using both visual spatial memory and patterns in skylight. When light strikes the ant's ommatidia, it is uniformly mapped along the ant's eye, creating a grid that can be used to determine its location.

References

External links

Formicinae
Hymenoptera of Africa
Insects described in 1793
Taxa named by Johan Christian Fabricius